Ragnar Olason (March 7, 1901 – June 7, 1978) was a Norwegian actor.

Olason was engaged with the Norwegian Theater and the National Theater in Oslo. He also performed as a screen actor, and he debuted in the 1940 film Godvakker-Maren. In the 1960s and 1970s, Olason performed on NRK's Television Theater.

Filmography
 1940: Godvakker-Maren as a worker
 1955: Trost i taklampa as Gunvor's father
 1955: Hjem går vi ikke
 1958: Elias rekefisker as the father
 1961: Hans Nielsen Hauge as a prison guard
 1973: To fluer i ett smekk as Fredriksen

References

External links
 
 Ulf Wengård at the Swedish Film Database
 Ragnar Olason at Filmfront
 Ragnar Olason at the National Theater

1901 births
1978 deaths
20th-century Norwegian male actors
People from Lier, Norway